The Spalding Power Plant and Dam, at 10 County Rd. in Spalding in Greeley County, Nebraska, was built in 1919.  It was listed on the National Register of Historic Places in 1998.

The  site listed included two contributing buildings, a contributing structure, and two contributing sites.

The buildings are one housing electrical generating engines and the wheel house which contains water powered turbines.  The structure is the combination of the dam, its water race, and headgates.  The sites are a golf course and a lake.

Gallery

References

Historic districts on the National Register of Historic Places in Nebraska
Buildings and structures completed in 1919
National Register of Historic Places in Greeley County, Nebraska
Dams in Nebraska
Hydroelectric power plants in Nebraska
Industrial buildings and structures on the National Register of Historic Places in Nebraska